The General Collection is a collection of various philatelic items from the whole world that forms part of the British Library Philatelic Collections. The collection includes material acquired since 1922.

References

British Library Philatelic Collections